A central or intermediate group of three or four large glands is imbedded in the adipose tissue near the base of the axilla.

Its afferent lymphatic vessels are the efferent vessels of all the preceding groups of axillary glands; its efferents pass to the subclavicular group.

Additional images

References

External links
 

Lymphatics of the upper limb